Over Wallop is a small village and civil parish in the Test Valley district of Hampshire, England.

Over Wallop is the westernmost of the three villages collectively known as The Wallops, the other two being Middle Wallop and Nether Wallop. The name "Wallop" derives from the Old English words  and hop, which taken together roughly mean "the valley of springing water". Over Wallop was described in the Domesday Book as the 'other Wallop', smaller than Nether Wallop.

Over Wallop contains the spring that sources a small river known by locals as “The Brook”. “The Brook” is a tributary of the River Test.

A  linear earthwork and flint mines are located in the parish. The earthwork, known as the Quarley High Linear band and ditch, was constructed  245 ± 155 BC. The flint mines date to 3983 ± 106 BC.

Amenities 
Over Wallop has a small village shop and a family run pub “The White Hart”.
The village also has two playing fields, one referred to as “The cricket field” and the other a park next to Evans Close.
Anyone who lives in Over Wallop is inside the catchment area for The Wallops Primary School and Test Valley School.
Over Wallop also has many bridle tracks for horses.
The parish of Over Wallop is in the Diocese of Winchester. St Peter's parish church is of 12th-century origin, but has Victorian features.

Further reading
 Anon St Peter's Over Wallop Hampshire: Guide Book

References

Villages in Hampshire